Rohan Lavery (born 13 September 2000) is an Australian representative rower. He is twice an Australian national champion and has represented at underage and senior World Championships. He won a bronze medal at the 2022 World Championships.

Club and state rowing
Lavery was educated at Wesley College Melbourne where he took up rowing. His Australian senior club rowing has been from the Melbourne University Boat Club in Melbourne.

Lavery's state representative debut for Victoria came in 2019 when he was selected in the state youth eight to contest the Noel Wilkinson trophy at the Interstate Regatta. In 2021 he was selected in the Victorian men's senior eight which contested and won the Kings Cup. In 2022 he again rowed in the Victorian men's senior eight at the Interstate Regatta.

International representative rowing
Lavery made his Australian representative debut as stroke of the coxless four at the 2019 U23 World Rowing Championships in Sarasota, Florida. That crew finished in overall ninth place. 

In March 2022 Lavery was selected in the Australian training team to prepare for the 2022 international season and the 2022 World Rowing Championships.  He stroked the Australian men's eight to silver medal placings at each of the World Rowing Cups in June and July. At the 2022 World Rowing Championships at Racize, Lavery moved into the bow seat of the eight rowing behind his brother Nicholas.
The eight won through their repechage to make the A final where they raced to a third place and a World Championship bronze medal.

References

External links

2000 births
Living people
Australian male rowers
People educated at Wesley College (Victoria)
World Rowing Championships medalists for Australia
21st-century Australian people